Anoop Misra is an Indian endocrinologist and a former honorary physician to the Prime Minister of India. He is the chairman of Fortis Centre for Diabetes, Obesity and Cholesterol (C-DOC) and heads, National Diabetes Obesity and Cholesterol Foundation (NDOC). A former Fellow of the World Health Organization at the Royal Free Hospital, UK, Misra is a recipient of the Dr. B. C. Roy Award, the highest Indian award in the medical category. The Government of India awarded him the fourth highest civilian honour of the Padma Shri, in 2007, for his contributions to Indian medicine.

Biography 
Misra graduated in medicine (MBBS) from the All India Institute of Medical Sciences Delhi (AIIMS) and continued his studies there to secure an MD in Internal Medicine. He has worked in many known medical institutions in the US and in India as a consultant or as a faculty member. In the US, he worked as a member of faculty at the Department of Endocrinology and Human Nutrition of the University of Texas Southwestern Medical Center and as a Fellow of the World Health Organization at Department of Diabetes and Cardiovascular Risk of the Royal Free Hospital, UK. In India, he worked as an adjunct faculty at the Indian Institute of Advanced Research, Gandhinagar, before shifting to New Delhi, to the All India Institute of Medical Sciences Delhi where he worked for 10 years and was the Head of Diabetes and Metabolism Group as well as the Clinical Pharmacology Unit when he moved to the Fortis Rajan Dhall Hospital as the Director of the Department of Diabetes and Metabolic Diseases.

Misra is known to have been involved in advanced researches in the fields of Diabetes and Obesity and is reported to have introduced novel definitions for obesity. His research interests included abdominal obesity and Syndrome X in Indians and is credited with development of dietary and exercise guidelines for Indians. His group has worked extensively on body fat depots, specifically hepatic and pancreatic fat, and their relationship with insulin resistance and the metabolic syndrome in Indian population. He has also conducted several intervention trials with nuts, edible oils and proteins in individuals having high risk for diabetes. He was a part of several research projects on the subject and his researches have been documented by way of over 300 articles published in peer reviewed journals. He is also associated with 15 scientific publications as a member of their editorial boards and has written editorials for The Lancet on three occasions. He is a member of the Scientific Advisory Board of Elsevier and is the Associate Editor of Journal of Diabetes, European Journal of Clinical Nutrition and Editor-in Chief of Diabetes and Metabolic Syndrome: Research and Reviews. Besides, he is a reviewer for over 30 journals including New England Journal of Medicine, Lancet, Circulation and The Journal of Clinical Endocrinology and Metabolism. In India, Dr Misra has been participant of top Advisory Committees relating to Diabetes and Cardiovascular diseases. He has been in advisory board member of National Program for Cancer, Diabetes, and CVD. He has been a member of World Health Organization Expert Group of Childhood Obesity and Indian Council of Medical Research Expert Groups for Childhood Obesity, Fatty Liver, Diabetes, and Gestational Diabetes.  He has been a Member, Technical Advisory Group on Adolescent Health, Ministry of Health, Governing Committee National Institute of Nutrition, National Nutrition Monitoring Bureau, and Expert Committee for Drugs Controller General of India. He has also been member of National Drug Technology Committee, and National Task Force on Male Fertility

Misra has served two Indian Prime Ministers as their honorary physician and has delivered many award lectures; S. N. Tripathy Memorial Oration, Prof. Austin E. Doyle Oration (2004), Dr K. L. Wig Oration (2005), Sam G. Moses Oration (2005), Prof. B. R. Sengupta Oration (2005), Searle Oration (2006), Amar Sen Oration (2006), D. K. Pal Chowdhary Oration (2006), Kamala Puri Sabharwal Oration (2007), Dr O. P.Gupta Oration (2007), Amrit Mody Oration (2008) and V. Ramalingaswami Oration (2009), RM Shah Oration (2017) are a few of them. In 2006, the Medical Council of India awarded him Dr. B. C. Roy Award, the highest Indian award in the medical category. He received one more award the same year, the President's Award of Excellence of the Rotary International, South and East Delhi chapter. The next year, he was listed among the Republic Day Honorees by the Government of India, for the fourth highest civilian award of the Padma Shri. In 2009, the Indian Economics Institute awarded him the Bharat Shiromani Puruskar. The next year he received two more awards, the 2010 Swastha Bharat Samman and the Spirit of Humanity Award of Americare Foundation. He has also received "Outstanding Investigator Award" from World India Diabetes Foundation in 2014. Currently, he is head of diabetes certification course at Fortis CDOC Center for Diabetes at New Delhi, in conjunction with British Medical Journal and Royal College of Physicians.

Misra was declared "Pharma Leaders Indian of the Year – Endocrinology" by the Pharma Leaders Group in India at the 11th Annual Pharmaceutical Leadership Summit & Pharma Leaders Business Leadership Awards 2018."

See also 
 Diabetes
 Syndrome X (metabolic)

References

External links 
 

Recipients of the Padma Shri in medicine
Dr. B. C. Roy Award winners
Year of birth missing (living people)
Indian endocrinologists
Indian diabetologists
All India Institute of Medical Sciences, New Delhi alumni
Academic staff of the All India Institute of Medical Sciences, New Delhi
World Health Organization officials
University of Texas at Dallas faculty
Indian medical researchers
Indian medical writers
Living people
Place of birth missing (living people)
20th-century Indian medical doctors
Indian officials of the United Nations